Eupen can be:

 Eupen, municipality located in the Belgian province of Liège
 Lake Eupen, located near Eupen in Belgium
 Marit van Eupen, rower from the Netherlands
 Theodor van Eupen, SS-Sturmbannführer in charge of Treblinka I Arbeitslager during the Holocaust
 K.A.S. Eupen, Belgian football club
 Eupen-Malmedy, group of cantons in Belgium
 Judicial Arrondissement of Eupen, judicial arrondissement located in the Walloon Province of Liège, in Belgium.